= Kopharad =

- Census town
- Location in Maharashtra, India
- Coordinates: 19.4433°N 72.784°E
- Country: India
- State: Maharashtra
- District: Palghar

Population (2001)
  - Total: 5,267

Languages
  - Official: Marathi
- Time zone: UTC+5:30 (IST)

Kopharad is a census town in Palghar district in the Indian state of Maharashtra.

== Demographics ==
As of 2001 India census, Kopharad had a population of 5,267. Males constitute 51% of the population and females 49%. Kopharad has an average literacy rate of 82%, higher than the national average of 59.5%: male literacy is 87%, and female literacy is 76%. In Kopharad, 10% of the population is under 6 years of age.
